Gander is a town located in the northeastern part of the island of Newfoundland in the Canadian province of Newfoundland and Labrador, approximately  south of Gander Bay,  south of Twillingate and  east of Grand Falls-Windsor. Located on the northeastern shore of Gander Lake, it is the site of Gander International Airport, once an important refuelling stop for transatlantic aircraft. The airport is still a preferred emergency landing point for aircraft facing on-board medical or security issues.

When the U.S. closed its airspace soon after the September 11 attacks, Gander International Airport took in 38 aircraft and accommodated nearly 6,700 evacuees from Olympic Airways, Air France, Lufthansa, British Airways, Alitalia and more. 
 
Most of the streets in Gander are named after famous aviators, including Alcock and Brown, Amelia Earhart, Charles Lindbergh, Eddie Rickenbacker, Marc Garneau and Chuck Yeager.

History
Gander was chosen for the construction of an airport in 1935 because it is very close to the great circle route between New York and London. In 1936, construction of the base began, and the town started to develop. On 11 January 1938, Captain Douglas Fraser made the first landing at "Newfoundland Airport," now known as Gander International Airport, or "CYQX," in a single-engine biplane, Fox Moth VO-ADE.

During the Second World War, as many as 10,000 Canadian, British and American military personnel resided in Gander. The area became a strategic post for the Air Ferry Command of the  Royal Air Force, with approximately 20,000 American- and Canadian-built fighters and bombers stopping at Gander en route to Europe. After the war, the airbase became a civilian airport, and the location of the town was moved a safe distance from the runways. Construction of the present town site began in the 1950s, and the present municipality was incorporated in 1958; the settlement around the airport was eventually abandoned.

After the Second World War, the town grew as the airport was used as a refuelling stop for transatlantic flights, earning its name "Cross-roads of the world." Efforts have been made to diversify the economy from being dependent on the airport, particularly as new aircraft designs permitted longer-range flights without the need for landing to refuel.

Gander was the site of a major aircraft accident, Arrow Air Flight 1285, on 12 December 1985. 256 people were killed in the disaster, probably caused by ice contamination on the wings, making it the deadliest air crash ever to happen in Canada.

In 2001, Gander International Airport played an integral role in world aviation in the hours immediately following the September 11 attacks when all of North America's airspace was closed by Transport Canada and the United States Federal Aviation Administration (FAA). As part of Operation Yellow Ribbon, 38 civilian and 4 military flights bound for the United States were ordered to land at the airport—more flights than any Canadian airport other than Halifax International. More than 6,600 passengers and airline crew members—equivalent to 66 percent of the local population at the time—were forced to stay in the Gander area for up to six days until airspace was reopened. Gander received the third highest volume of passengers following Operation Yellow Ribbon, behind Vancouver International Airport, which received 8,500, and Halifax International. Residents of Gander and surrounding communities volunteered to house, feed, and entertain the travellers as part of Operation Yellow Ribbon. This was largely because Transport Canada and Nav Canada asked that transatlantic flights avoid diverting to major airports in central Canada, such as Toronto Pearson and Montréal-Dorval.

Lufthansa named one of its Airbus A340 (registration D-AIFC) aircraft Gander/Halifax to thank both cities for their handling of rerouted travellers on 11 September. A book, The Day the World Came to Town, included several stories about Gander's role during that and subsequent days. A radio play, The Day the Planes Came, by Caroline and David Stafford, dealing with the effect on Gander of the 11 September passengers was first broadcast in June 2008 on BBC Radio 4 and was repeated in October 2009. A TV movie, Diverted, was made in 2009. In February 2010, NBC aired a report by Tom Brokaw covering Gander's part in the grounding of hundreds of planes on 9/11 during coverage of the 2010 Winter Olympics in Vancouver. A musical by Irene Sankoff and David Hein, Come from Away, which retells the stories of passengers and Newfoundlanders in Gander after Operation Yellow Ribbon, was mounted on Broadway in 2017. The same year, Come From Away was nominated for 7 Tony Awards and won the Tony for Best Direction of Musical. The town was also profiled in Moze Mossanen's 2018 documentary film You Are Here. National Geographic Episode "9/11: Control The Skies" tells the story of the air traffic controllers, first broadcast on 11 September 2019.

The Town of Gander continues to pursue business opportunities in the aerospace industry.

Geography
Ordovician-era shale, slate and greywacke form the underlying bedrock, which is covered by stony loam to silt loam podzolic or gleysolic soil.

Demographics

As of the 2006 census, the population of Gander was found to be 97.4% white with all visible minorities totaling 0.9% of the population and the aboriginal population totaling 1.7%.

Climate
Gander has a cool to cold humid continental climate (Köppen climate classification (Dfb). It combines moderately warm and rainy summers with cold and very snowy winters. Due to the maritime influence from the Atlantic Ocean, seasonal changes are slightly less pronounced than in Canada's interior, but still substantial given its near-coastal position. Its average frost-free period runs from June 1 to October 16–136 days.

Services 
Gander offers all the conveniences of a major centre. The newest development is a continually expanding business park with big box stores such as Walmart and Kent Building Supplies. There are two malls: the Gander Mall, with stores such as Canadian Tire, Sport Chek, Mark's, Dollarama, Ardene, Reitmans, and Pizza Delight, and the Fraser Mall, with a Foodland, Great Canadian Dollar Store and various government offices. Town Square at the intersection of Elizabeth Drive and Airport Boulevard has several local businesses including a Co-op grocery store.

All five major Canadian banks have branches in Gander. TD Canada Trust and RBC Royal Bank are located in Town Square, CIBC in the Fraser Mall, as well as Bank of Montreal and Scotiabank on Airport Boulevard and Roe Avenue, respectively. There are two Credit Unions: Newfoundland and Labrador Credit Union and Hamilton Sound Credit Union, both on Roe Avenue.

Medical services are provided by the James Paton Memorial Health Centre, on the Trans-Canada Highway. The hospital opened in May 1964 and has undergone many changes since then, making it a prominent hospital in the central region. The hospital has a rated beds capacity of 92.

Telephone services are provided by Bell Aliant, formerly NewTel Communications. Bell Aliant also provides DSL high-speed internet service and FibreOp high-speed internet. Rogers Communications is the cable TV and cable internet provider for the town.
Cellular phone service is also available through Telus, its subsidiary Koodo, and Bell's Virgin Mobile.

The Gander Public Library is located at 6 Bell Place as of 1987.

In popular culture 
Gander airport features in the Nevil Shute novel No Highway and the film adaptation, called No Highway in the Sky in Anglophone countries other than the UK.

in 2006, the miniseries Above and Beyond deals with the Atlantic Ferry Organization, tasked with ferrying aircraft from North America to Europe in the early years of the Second World War. The production was filmed primarily at the Gander airport, and details the development of the airport as a ferry stop.

In 2013, Come from Away, a musical by Irene Sankoff and David Hein based on the events in Gander on and after 11 September was first performed at Sheridan College in Oakville, Ontario, following a workshop there the previous year. It became a co-production of the La Jolla Playhouse and the Seattle Repertory Theatre, and opened in San Diego on 29 May 2015. The show saw a production in Washington, D.C., at Ford's Theatre, from September to October 2016, then, prior to opening in Toronto, staged a pair of shows in Gander. It opened at Toronto's Royal Alexandra Theatre, running from November 2016 to January 2017, where it set a ticket sales record for the 109-year-old venue. It opened in New York on Broadway at the Gerald Schoenfeld Theatre on 12 March 2017, and is scheduled to return to the Royal Alex in Toronto on 13 February 2018. In the year 2017, at the 71st Tony Awards, the musical was nominated for seven Tony Awards, alongside other musical award nominations, ultimately winning one for Best Direction of a Musical by Christopher Ashley.

Planetary nomenclature
In 1991, the International Astronomical Union's Working Group for Planetary System Nomenclature (IAU/WGPSN) officially named a crater on Mars after Gander.

Public parks, walking and ski trails
 Cobbs Pond Rotary Park: a small park located on the northern edge of Gander. Amenities include: picnic area, washrooms, wharf, playground and a  boardwalk trail. It is also the site of the town’s annual festival, The Festival of Flight, which occurs on the first Monday of August. The site recently reopened with renovations.
Amenities include: three walking trails with interpretive panels, a picnic area, washrooms and snowshoe trails.
 Gander Heritage Trails: meander through the streets of old airport sectors where Gander once existed, near Gander International Airport. Look for remnants of old building foundations, benches and interpretive panels.
 Newfoundland Trailway: the old Canadian National Railway that passed through Gander has been developed for walking, biking, snowmobiling and cross-country skiing. Some sections between Cobb’s Pond Rotary Park and the Old Town Site have been paved.
Ski  of lighted trails nightly from dusk until 10 PM (weather and snow conditions permitting). The club is a non-profit, volunteer-run organization that has hosted a number of provincial events including the KidsFest, Midget and High School Championships.
 Gander Heritage Memorial Park: located in central Gander on Airport Boulevard. It holds various monuments to aviators and soldiers from Gander and from elsewhere in Newfoundland, and the town describes it as being "envisaged as a place of quiet thought and contemplation". There is a statue of Gander, a Newfoundland dog posthumously awarded the Dickin Medal, the "animals' VC", in 2000 for his deeds in World War II, the first such award in over 50 years.

Freedom of the Town
In 2017, the 103 Search and Rescue Squadron, RCAF received the Freedom of the Town award.

See also
North Atlantic Aviation Museum

References

Further reading

External links
 
 Town of Gander (official site)

 
Towns in Newfoundland and Labrador